Dagudumootha Dandakor is a 2015 Indian Telugu-language comedy drama film, produced by Ramoji Rao on Ushakiran Movies & First Frame Entertainment banner, presented by director Krish and directed by R. K. Malineni. Starring Rajendra Prasad, Sara Arjun  and music composed by E. S. Murthy. The film is remake of Tamil Movie Saivam (2014). The film is debut to director R. K. Malineni and Sara Arjun replicated her role in Telugu. The film failed to do well at the box office.

Plot
The film begins in a village where Rajugaru (Rajendra Prasad) a top tier and paterfamilias to his family consisting of 3 sons, a daughter, and their respective clan. Everyone gets together for a vacation after a long time. Once, they all visit their temple on a given day when some ill-fated events occur which they predict as inauspicious due to a forgotten ritual sacrifice which involves the slaughtering a rooster called Nani, from their poultry. The thought fuels each family member blaming it as the cause of their problems. Right now, Rajugaru decides to ritual in the upcoming festival. Thereupon, as a flabbergast, Nani goes missing which makes the entire family aghast. Indeed, it has been concealed at attic by Rajugaru's granddaughter Bangaram (Sara Arjun) in order to save as she is fond of it. The rest of the story revolves around various attempts of Bangaram to save Nani and the family's to find it. In doing so, the film showcases the lost values of family and a child's innocent towards rooster. Finally, the movie culminates into a happy ending.

Cast

Soundtrack

Music composed & Lyrics were written by E. S. Murthy. Music released on ADITYA Music Company. The movie's audio was launched on 30 January 2015 at Ramoji Film City in Hyderabad, by Ramoji Rao and A. L. Vijay, director of the original film, who was the chief guest at the event.

References 

2015 directorial debut films
2015 films
Telugu remakes of Tamil films
2010s Telugu-language films